Bill Pearson is an Australian former professional rugby league footballer who played in the 1950s and 1960s.

In 1955 Pearson started playing for the Ipswich Rugby League's West End club. In 1957 he became a regular centre for the Queensland rugby league team's annual matches against New South Wales.

Pearson moved to Brisbane, playing with the Northern Suburbs club. He played for the Maroons against Great Britain in 1958. Pearson also played for Brisbane in the Bulimba Cup.

In 1964 Pearson moved to Bundaberg where he started playing for the Brothers club in the forwards and became captain coach. In 1965 Brothers reached the grand final in which Pearson was sent off, his team losing to Wanderers.  However, in the grand final the following year Brothers defeated Natives. In 1966 he also captained Wide Bay's state championship winning team. In 1967 the Pearson-led Brothers side won the premiership again. That year he also captained the Bundaberg team against the Australian national team at Salter Oval in Bundaberg, the home team putting up a fine performance going down 31-12.

References

Australian rugby league coaches
Australian rugby league players
Queensland rugby league team players
Brisbane rugby league team players
Norths Devils players
Rugby league five-eighths